The Malpeque Outer Range Lights are a set of range lights on Prince Edward Island, Canada. They were built in 1922, and are still active.

See also
 List of lighthouses in Prince Edward Island
 List of lighthouses in Canada

References

External links
Picture of Malpeque Outer Range Front Light Lighthouse Friends
 Aids to Navigation Canadian Coast Guard

Lighthouses completed in 1922
Lighthouses in Prince Edward Island